Cymindis bedeli is a species of ground beetle in the subfamily Harpalinae. It was described by Tschitscherine in 1897.

References

bedeli
Beetles described in 1897